Wardama is a Basic People's Congress administrative division of Bayda, Libya. Wardama is located about 5 km northwest of the city of Bayda.

See also 
 List of cities in Libya

References

Basic People's Congress divisions of Bayda
Populated places in Jabal al Akhdar